The 2014 Speedway European Championship season was the second season of the Speedway European Championship (SEC) era, and decided the 14th UEM Individual Speedway European Championship. It was the second series under the promotion of One Sport Lts. of Poland.

The championship was won by Russia's Emil Sayfutdinov, six points ahead of Danish rider Peter Kildemand. Third place went to another Danish rider, Nicki Pedersen, who was another four points behind Kildemand. Pedersen had won the opening two races of the season, before Sayfutdinov moved ahead in the standings after a win at Holsted in Denmark. A fourth-place finish in Częstochowa – an event won by Russian Grigory Laguta – was enough to give Sayfutdinov the title.

Qualification 
For the 2014 season, 15 permanent riders were joined at each SEC Final by one wild card and two track reserves.

Defending champion, Martin Vaculík from Slovakia was automatically invited to participate in all final events. Nicki Pedersen and Grigorij Laguta secured their participation in all final events thanks to being in the top 3 of the general classification in the 2013 season.

Emil Sayfutdinov, Andreas Jonsson and Tomasz Gollob received and accepted a wild card to compete in the 2014 Speedway European Championships.

Qualified riders

Controversy 
The European Union Motorcycle (FIM-Europe) introduced a formal ban that prevented riders in the Speedway Grand Prix taking part in the Speedway European Championship. The decision had been rumoured for weeks before being officially confirmed on 3 November 2013. That meant that all riders taking part in the World Championship could not be regular participants of the SEC. Amongst the riders who received permanent wild cards from the SEC were Emil Sayfutdinov, Andreas Jonsson and Tomasz Gollob.

Shortly after this, riders started to show the support to the SEC and their displeasure about the situation. As a result of this, already invited rider Tomasz Gollob, Andreas Jonsson, Nicki Pedersen and Emil Sayfutdinov sent an open letter to the FIM-Europe requesting the solution of the situation.

A statement from series organisers One Sport Lts. on 17 November 2013 pointed out that the ban was inconsistent with European law and announced an intention to take required legal action. They used the European Union Microsoft competition case as an example.

On 29 November, Emil Sayfutdinov announced that he was prepared to drop out of the 2014 SGP series in order to ride in the Speedway European Championship. As a reason, he explained that his Russian sponsors insisted their logos were seen in their country and SEC tournaments were transmitted by a Eurosport channel available in Russia, whereas Grand Prix competitions were not shown by any TV channel in Russia. Moreover, one of SEC tournaments was due to be held in Russia in 2014. On the same day, Tomasz Gollob also announced that he would participate in the Speedway European Championship.

On 6 December, Janek Konikiewicz, a representative for One Sport Lts., tweeted that "It seems that there will be no ban for SGP riders in SEC 2014. Another strong signal, that we have won – but still nothing official". On 20 December, he also tweeted another message: "OFFICIAL: One Sport received an official letter from FIM-Europe with information that they advised FIM to not ban any riders from SEC", which basically ended the story.

On 7 February 2014, the FIM board of directors officially took the decision to ban World Championship participants from participating in any kind of European Championships tournament. One Sport LLC declared their disapproval with the FIM's decision. Shortly after, Tomasz Gollob announced that he would refuse his wild card invitation for the SGP Bydgoszcz tournament, whereas Andreas Jonsson decided to refuse his SEC invitation in favour of participating in SGP. Emil Sayfutdinov asked to drop his application for SGP.

On 28 February 2014, the FIM board of directions officially announced that the previous ban for SGP riders to participate in SEC was delayed until 1 January 2015.

Changes 
In the 2014 season, the participating riders had the possibility to choose the number which would be on their race jacket. In the past, the riders in all tournaments had an obligatory number which was given to them by the organizers. During the first tournament, the defending champion wore a yellow race jacket and for all following tournaments, the current general classification leader wore the jacket.

Calendar

Qualification 

The calendar for qualification consisted of 3 Semifinal events and one SEC Challenge event. At the end of March, the first semifinal round was moved from the Ukraine to Latvia.

Championship Series 

A four-event calendar was scheduled for the final series, with events in Germany, Russia, Denmark and Poland.

Classification

See also 
 2014 Speedway Grand Prix

References

External links 

 

2014
European Championship
Speedway European Championship